The Aquitani were a tribe that lived in the region between the Pyrenees, the Atlantic ocean, and the Garonne, in present-day southwestern France in the 1st century BCE. The  Romans dubbed this region Gallia Aquitania. Classical authors such as Julius Caesar and Strabo clearly distinguish the Aquitani from the other peoples of Gaul, and note their similarity to others in the Iberian Peninsula.

During the process of Romanization, the Aquitani gradually adopted Latin (Vulgar Latin) and the Roman civilization. Their old language, the Aquitanian language, was a precursor of the Basque language
and the substrate for the Gascon language (one of the Romance languages) spoken in Gascony.

History

At the time of the Roman conquest, Julius Caesar, who defeated them in his campaign in Gaul, describes them as making up a distinct part of Gaul:

Despite apparent cultural and linguistic connections to (Vascones), the area of Aquitania, as a part of Gaul ended at the Pyrenees according to Caesar:

Relation to Basque people and language
The presence, on late Romano-Aquitanian funerary slabs and altars, of what seem to be the names of deities or people similar to certain names in modern Basque have led many philologists and linguists to conclude that Aquitanian was closely related to an older form of Basque. Julius Caesar draws a clear line between the Aquitani, living in present-day south-western France and speaking Aquitanian, and their neighboring Celts living to the north. The fact that the region was known as Vasconia in the Early Middle Ages, a name that evolved into the better known form of Gascony, along with other toponymic evidence, seems to corroborate that assumption.

Tribes

Although the country where the original Aquitanians lived came to be named Novempopulania (nine peoples) in the late years of the Roman Empire and Early Middle Ages (up to the 6th century), the number of tribes varied (about 20 for Strabo, but comparing with the information of other classical authors such as Pliny, Ptolemy and Julius Caesar, the total number were 32 or 33):

Aquitani tribes 

 Apiates/Aspiates in the Aspe Valley (Gave d'Aspe Valley)
 Aturenses in the banks of the Adour (Aturus) river
 Arenosii or Airenosini in Aran valley, (high Garonne valley), part of Aquitania and not of Hispania in the Roman Empire
 Ausci in the east around Auch (Elimberris, metropolis of Aquitania)
 Benearni or Benearnenses/Venarni in and around low Béarn, Pau, Pyrénées-Atlantiques
 Bercorates/Bercorcates
 Bigerriones or Begerri in the west of the French département of High Pyrenees (medieval county of Bigorre)
 Boiates/Boates/Boii Boiates/Boviates in the coastal region of Pays de Buch and Pays de Born, in the Northwest of Landes
 Camponi (may have been the same tribe as the Oscidates Campestres)
 Cocosates/Sexsignani in the west of Landes département
 Consoranni in the tributary streams of the high Garonne river in the former province of Couserans, today's west half of the Ariège départment and extreme south of Haute-Garonne
 Convenae, a “groupement” in the southeast (high Garonne valley) in and around Lugdunum Convenarum
 Datii, in the Ossau Valley, high Béarn
 Elusates in the northeast around Eauze (former Elusa)
 Gates between the Elusates and the Ausci
 Iluronenses in and around Iluro (Oloron-Sainte-Marie)
 Lactorates or Lectorates in and around Lectoure
 Monesii or Osii or Onesii in the high Garonne river valley (Louchon), only mentioned in Strabo's Geographica
 Onobrisates in Nébouzan in the high Garonne river valley and its tributaries, possibly the same tribe as the Onesii or Osii or Monesii
 Oscidates in several valleys and slopes of the west Pyrenees, high Béarn, south of the Iluronenses
 Oscidates Campestres
 Oscidates Montani
 Ptianii in Orthez
 Sassumini/Lassumini/Lassunni
 Sibyllates or Suburates probably around Soule/Xüberoa and also Saubusse; the same of Cæsar’s Sibuzates/Sibusates?
 Sotiates in the north around Sos-en-Albret (south of Lot-et-Garonne department)
 Succasses
 Tarbelli or Tarbelii/Quattuorsignani in the coastal side of Landes, with Dax (Aquis Tarbellicis)
 Tarusates in the Midou, Douze and Midouze valley, east of Cocosates and Tarbelli
 Tarusci in the high Ariège river valley in the former province of Foix, today's east half of the Ariège department
 Umbranici
 Vellates in high Bidassoa river valley
 Venami/Venarni in and around Beneharnum (modern-day Lescar)
 Vasates/Volcates in the north around Bazas (south of Gironde department)

Aquitani related peoples or tribes
In the southern slopes of western Pyrenees Mountains, not in Aquitania but in northern Hispania Tarraconensis:

Iacetani in high Aragon River valley, in and around Jaca, in the southern slopes of western Pyrenees Mountains in today's northwestern Aragon, Spain
Vascones in the southern slopes of western Pyrenees Mountains in today's Navarra, Spain

See also

Aquitanian language
Gauls
Novempopulania
Gallia Aquitania
Duchy of Vasconia
Vascones
Iberians
Gascony
Late Basquisation
Pre-Roman peoples of the Iberian Peninsula

References

External links
 http://penelope.uchicago.edu/Thayer/E/Roman/home.html - 51 complete works of authors from Classical Antiquity (Greek and Roman).
 http://penelope.uchicago.edu/Thayer/E/Roman/Texts/Caesar/Gallic_War/home.html - Julius Caesar text of De Bello Gallico (Gallic War).
 http://penelope.uchicago.edu/Thayer/E/Roman/Texts/Pliny_the_Elder/home.html - Pliny the Elder text of Naturalis Historia (Natural History) - books 3-6 (Geography and Ethnography).
 http://penelope.uchicago.edu/Thayer/E/Roman/Texts/Strabo/home.html - Strabo's text of De Geographica (The Geography).

Gaul
Pre-Roman peoples of the Iberian Peninsula
Aquitani
Basque history
Tribes involved in the Gallic Wars
History of Aquitaine
Gallia Aquitania